Kurt Gödel (28 April 1906 – 14 January 1978) was an Austrian (later American) logician, mathematician and philosopher.

Godel or similar may also refer to:
Gödel (programming language)
3366 Gödel, a main belt asteroid discovered in 1985
Gödel, Kastamonu, a village in the Kastamonu Province, Turkey
Godel (river), at Föhr, Schleswig-Holstein, Germany
Godel Iceport, at the coast of Queen Maud Land, Antarctica

Other people with the surname Godel include:
Gaston Godel (1914−2004), Swiss race walker
Vahé Godel (born 1931), Swiss writer
Arkadiusz Godel (born 1952), Polish fencer
Jon Godel, 21st-century British journalist

See also
Godel mouthpiece, a scuba mouthpiece with a snorkel attached